The Friend of China, officially The Friend of China and Hongkong Gazette from 1842 to 1859, was an influential English-language newspaper in early British Hong Kong and among European residents of the Qing Empire. Its first issue was published, as The Friend of China, on 17 March 1842. Upon the appearance of its second issue, 24 March 1842, the paper was amalgamated with the colonial government gazette, the Hong Kong Gazette. In 1845 the paper lost its government connection but retained the title of the Gazette. From this point the Friend of China adopted a generally antagonistic stance towards the colonial government, and spoke for the interests of the local European merchant community. A mainland edition of the paper, the Overland Friend of China, was published separately for a time.

The Friend of Chinas final owner and editor, William Tarrant, purchased the paper in 1850 and, after taking part in numerous political controversies, was imprisoned for libel in 1859. The Friend of China ceased publication, before resuming briefly at Canton following Tarrant's release in 1860 until 1861, and then at Shanghai from 1863 to 1869. Tarrant sold the paper in 1869, and the Friend of China folded permanently shortly thereafter.

See also
 Hong Kong Government Gazette

References

Newspapers established in 1842
Publications disestablished in 1869
Government gazettes
Defunct newspapers published in Hong Kong
English-language newspapers published in Hong Kong
Newspapers published in Shanghai
1842 establishments in Hong Kong
1869 disestablishments in Hong Kong